Borgøy (alternately spelled Borgøya or Borgøyna) is an island in Tysvær municipality in Rogaland county, Norway. The  island is located at the southern end of the Skjoldafjorden. South of the island lies the Hervikfjorden.

The island is accessible only by boat as there are no bridge or tunnel connections.  The main population centre is the relatively flat southwestern coast of the island.  Borgøy was the birthplace of painter Lars Hertervig.  The island has tin and granite mines.

References

Islands of Rogaland
Tysvær